This is a list of defunct airlines of Central African Republic 
.

See also

 List of airlines of the Central African Republic
 List of airports in the Central African Republic

References

 
Central African Republic